

List of Ambassadors

Mordechai Palzur (Non-Resident, Santo Domingo) 1982 - 1986
Daniel Biran Bayor (Non-Resident, Santo Domingo) 2018–present

Ambassadors Bayor and Palzur also served concurrently to St. Kitts and Nevis.

References

Antigua and Barbuda
Israel